The International Dance Music Awards or IDMAs was an annual awards ceremony held in Miami Beach, Florida, United States as a major part of the Winter Music Conference. The awards were held every year from 1985-2020, except for 2017, when the conference was in the process of being purchased by Miami Music Week (the organisers of Ultra Music Festival).

Pre–2016

Below are external archive links to all recorded awards ceremonies dating from 1998 to 2016:

1998: 

1999: 

2000: 

2001: 

2002: 

2003: 

2004: 

2005: 

2006: 

2007: 

2008: 

2009: 

2010: 

2011: 

2012: 

2013: 

2014: 

2015: 

2016:

2018
Nb: There was no shortlist to the 2018 awards, only winners were chosen.

2019

Industry categories

Artist categories

2020

Industry categories

Artist Categories

See also
 DJ Awards
 Miami Music Week
 Ultra Music Festival
 Winter Music Conference

References

American music awards
Dance music awards
DJing
International music awards